Ildar Ilhamovich Rakhmatullin (born 6 March 1986) is a Russian racing driver currently competing in the Russian Circuit Racing Series. He previously competed in the TCR International Series and FIA European Rallycross Championship.

Racing career
Rakhmatullin began his career in 1996 in karting. In 2007 he switched to the Russian Ice Racing Championship, he won the championship that year. In 2008 he switched to the Russian Rallycross Championship, finishing the season 4th in the championship standings. He switched to the FIA European Rallycross Championship in 2009, he raced in the championship up until 2013, finishing second in the championship standings in 2010 and 2013. In June 2015, it was announced that Rakhmatullin would make his TCR International Series debut with WestCoast Racing driving a Honda Civic TCR.

Racing record

Complete FIA European Rallycross Championship

Division 1A

Super1600

Complete TCR International Series results
(key) (Races in bold indicate pole position) (Races in italics indicate fastest lap)

† Driver did not finish the race, but was classified as he completed over 75% of the race distance.

References

External links
 

1986 births
Living people
Russian racing drivers
TCR International Series drivers
Russian Circuit Racing Series drivers
European Rallycross Championship drivers
Sportspeople from Kazan